The ARIA Singles Chart ranks the best-performing singles in Australia. Its data, published by the Australian Recording Industry Association, is based collectively on the weekly physical and digital sales and streams of singles. In 2020, eleven songs reached number one, with "Dance Monkey" by Tones and I returning to the top on the first chart of the year after spending 21 weeks atop the chart in 2019. Nine artists, The Weeknd, Saint Jhn, DaBaby, Roddy Ricch, Jawsh 685, Cardi B, Megan Thee Stallion, 24kGoldn and Iann Dior, reached the top for the first time.

Chart history

Number-one artists

See also
2020 in music
List of number-one albums of 2020 (Australia)
List of top 10 singles in 2020 (Australia)

References

Australia singles
Number-one singles
2020